Langelurillus horrifer is a jumping spider species in the genus Langelurillus that lives in Guinea. It was first identified in 2002.

References

Fauna of Guinea
Salticidae
Spiders described in 2002
Spiders of Africa
Taxa named by Wanda Wesołowska